Promise is a brand of toothpaste that was launched in 1978 by Balsara hygiene in India. Initially, the brand was successful and commanded second highest marketshare after Colgate which was then the market leader. The success of the brand was attributed to the fact that it was positioned as a toothpaste made of clove oil, which is traditionally used in India to treat dental ailments. The brand's tagline was "The unique toothpaste with time-tested clove oil". Its brand ambassador was Maya Alagh. In 1994, the company launched a 2-in-1 gel under the Promise brand, however this product failed because it was aimed at the youth segment which did not relate to Promise's strong clove taste. In 2005, Promise was sold by Balsara to Dabur along with other Balsara toothpaste brands Babool and Meswak in a  deal.

See also

List of toothpaste brands
Index of oral health and dental articles

References

Brands of toothpaste
Oral hygiene
Indian brands
Dabur Group